Lists of Armenian Churches cover Armenian Apostolic, Catholic or Evangelical church buildings in different countries.

Armenia
List of churches in Yerevan
List of cathedrals in Armenia
List of monasteries in Armenia

Other countries
List of Armenian churches in Azerbaijan
List of Armenian churches in Iran
List of Armenian churches in Russia
Armenian churches of Tbilisi, Georgia
List of active Armenian churches in Turkey

See also
Armenian Church (disambiguation)

Lists of churches
Oriental Orthodoxy-related lists